Betty Hahn (born 1940) is an American photographer known for working in alternative and early photographic processes. She completed both her BFA (1963) and MFA (1966) at Indiana University. Initially, Hahn worked in other two-dimensional art mediums before focusing on photography in graduate school. She is well-recognized due to her experimentation with experimental photographic methods which incorporate different forms of media. By transcending traditional concepts of photography, Hahn challenges the viewer not only to assess the content of the image, but also to contemplate the photographic object itself.

Biography
Betty Hahn was born on October 11, 1940, in Chicago, Illinois where she also grew up. At the age of ten, Hahn was given her first camera by an aunt. Hahn later on went to graduate from Scecina Memorial Catholic High School. Soon after, she enrolled at Indiana University with a full scholarship where she furthered her studies in Fine Arts, receiving both her BFA (1963) and her MFA (1966). Throughout her undergraduate years, she concentrated in drawing and painting; however, as she entered graduate study, she worked in photography. During this important developmental period, Hahn studied under one of the most well-known photography teachers of the time, Henry Holmes Smith, who encouraged Hahn's work in alternative processes.

Once she graduated, Hahn moved to Rochester where she taught at the Rochester Institute of Technology until 1975. Hahn then relocated to Albuquerque where she was professor at University of New Mexico until her retirement in 1997.

Work

Hahn is best known for her explorations of alternative processes in photography, using both older methods of darkroom developing such as gum-bichromate and cyanotypes, with other art mediums, including hand-painting and even embroidery. She is noted as one of the first photographers to successfully integrate such a variety of art mediums.

Hahn encourages the viewer to think more deeply through not only the use of different physical processes in her artwork, but also through the multiplicity of meanings in her photographs. In most of her work, Hahn integrates humor and irony as she explores the meanings generated by formal combinations. Some of her prints include the sprocket holes of the 35mm negative, which allude to its 35mm film origins: but by hand coloring with bright paints, she draws attention to the mixture of craft with industrial mediums.

Once she started experimenting with the gum-bichromate process, Hahn started stitching into her photographs. Printing onto canvas and other fabrics allowed her to use thread to highlight certain aspects of the photograph. In combining her photographs with conventional practices, Hahn successfully intertwines formal and conceptual aspects. Not only does she speak to the mundane tasks of everyday life, but also about routine and normativity. In highlighting the ordinary in her work, Hahn elevates and revives that which has been lost in the practice of daily life. Embroidery references femininity, as Hahn underlines the feminist issue of the anonymity of women's handicraft. Her embroidery often emphasized flowers with its three-dimensionality, furthering the idea of femininity; she later on pursued this as a symbol and incorporated it in several of her other series.

Art and Feminism 
In her work, Hahn delivers a powerful message in regards to women and embroidery. It is quite evident through time that women's labor is needlework, and that their labor is frequently undervalued as craft both when dissimilar and alike to men's work. In a time period where men overshadowed women in the traditional art, such as painting and sculpture, women oftentimes reverted to other mediums like textiles.

It has been suggested that women's work, especially in embroidery, is of little value in the art field since it is considered a craft. Since "arts and crafts" are more often than not paired together, it is obvious they are in the same category; however, there is a clear distinction. For 300 years, women have been taught needlework through practice and tradition, and in inadvertently, promoted obedience and household effeminate behavior. As a result, instead of regarding stitching as an art, many viewed it as a thoughtless skill, lacking originality. On the contrary, however, it is far more than evident that the hand of woman is more than a mindless and conforming thing, it is one of sensitivity, thought, patience, perseverance, and strength. By incorporating embroidery and stitching, Betty Hahn pushes the audience to acknowledge the work of women not as craft or tradition, but as meticulous, creative and unique.

Exhibitions

The Division of Photographic History at the Smithsonian Institution exhibited Hahn's work in a group exhibit in the 1960s as a part of a developing series of displaying the works of women photographers. Afterwards her work was featured in multiple thematic exhibitions at the Smithsonian.

Hahn's first solo show exhibiting her work was in 1973 at the Witkin Gallery in New York City. Thereafter, she received several grants from the National Endowment for the Arts in 1974, 1978, and 1983 to continue her work in explorative photography.

Hahn's art has been exhibited throughout the country and worldwide featured in museums highlighting historical processes in Baltimore, Maryland (1972) and nature photography exhibitions in Osaka, Japan (1990). Her work has been displayed at the Albuquerque Museum of Art and Art History (2017), Phoenix Art Museum (2015), and the George Eastman House (2012, 2016). Hahn's work is held in private collectors, galleries, and in permanent museum collections, including the San Francisco Museum of Modern Art, Center for Creative Photography and the Museum of Modern Art.

Exhibitions 
 1996 – George Eastman House International Museum of Photography and film, Rochester, New York
 1997 – A History of Women Photographers, Akron Art Museum 
 1997 – Eye of the Beholder, Photographs of the Avon Collection, International Center of Photography, Midtown, New York City
 1998 – Passing Shots: A Travel Series, University of New Mexico Art Museum, Albuquerque, New Mexico
 1998 – The City Series, Taos, Albuquerque, Santa Fe, Cedar Rapids Museum of Art, Cedar Rapids, IA
 1999 – Photography Or Maybe Not, a Betty Hahn traveling retrospective, Mikhailovsky Palace, St. Petersburg, Russia
 2000 – 20/20 Twentieth Century Photographic Acquisitions by 20 leading patrons, Museum of New Mexico, Museum of Fine Arts
 2000 – Photography Or Maybe Not, a Betty Hahn traveling retrospective, Santa Fe de Granada, Spain
 2001 – In the Eyes of the Beholder: Ten Photographers View Albuquerque, The University of New Mexico Hospital, Albuquerque, NM
 2002 – Sun Works Contemporary Alternative Photography, The Art Institute of Boston
 2002 – Flowers from the Permanent Collection, The Albuquerque Museum, Albuquerque, New Mexico
 2004 – 30th Anniversary Permanent Collection Exhibition, New Mexico State, University Art Gallery, Las Cruces, New Mexico
 2005 – New Mexico State University Art Gallery, Las Cruces, New Mexico
 2005 – Ace in the Hole, the legacy of Peter Walch, University Art Museum, University of New Mexico, Albuquerque, NM
 2006 – The collectible moment, Norton Simon museum, Pasadena, California
 2006 – The Social Lens, University of Virginia Art Museum, Charlottesville, Virginia
 2007 – Seeing Ourselves: Masterpieces of American Photography, A Traveling
 2007 – Exhibition, George Eastman House, Rochester, New York
 2008 – Flower Power: a Subversive Botanical, New Mexico Museum of Art, Santa Fe, NM
 2008 – Bernalillo County Arts Board Gallery, One Civic Plaza NW, Albuquerque, NM
 2008 – Giving Shelter 516 Arts Albuquerque, NM (A Sister Exhibition to the Cradle Project)
 2008 – Betty Hahn, Joyce Neimanas, and Judith Golden, Harwood Art Center Albuquerque, NM
 2009 – Through the Lens: Creating Santa Fe, Palace of the Governors, The New Mexico History Museum, Santa Fe, NM
 2009 – Altered Land: Photography in the 1970s, Sheldon Museum of Art, University of Nebraska, Lincoln, Nebraska
 2010 – Sole Mates Cowboy Boots & Art, New Mexico Museum of Art
 2010 – Rock Scissors Paper, Anderson Contemporary Arts, Albuquerque, NM
 2010 – Recollection 2010, Works from the Colorado Photographic Arts Center, The Central Library, Vida Ellison Gallery, Denver, Colorado
 2012 – 60 From the 60's (an exhibit of influential photos from the 1960s) George Eastman House, Rochester, New York
 2012 –  Albuquerque Now-Fall and Albuquerque Now-Winter, The Albuquerque Museum of Art and History, Albuquerque, NM
 2013 – It's About Time: 14,000 Years of Art in New Mexico, The New Mexico Museum of Art, Albuquerque, NM
 2014 – Alternative Lineage – Honoring Betty Hahn; 5 Decades of Mentoring
 2014 – Alternative Photographic Processes, Center for Photographic Art Carmel, California
 2014 – Alternative Lineage, Northlight Gallery, Arizona State University, Tempe, Arizona
 2014 – Transformational Imagemaking, Handmade Photography Since 1960
 2014 – An Exhibition Curated by Robert Hirsch, CEPA Gallery, Buffalo, NY
 2014 – Museum Project, dnj Gallery, Santa Monica, California
 2014 – American Heritage Center and Art Museum, University of Wyoming, Laramie, Wyoming
 2014 – Hubbard Museum of the American West, Ruidoso, New Mexico
 2015 - One-Of-A-Kind, unique photographic objects from the Center of Creative Photography, University of Arizona, Tucson, AZ
 2015 – Unconfined – Empowering Women Through Art, African American Performing Arts Center, New Mexico Expo, Albuquerque, NM
 2015 – Visualizing Albuquerque: Art of Central New Mexico, Albuquerque Museum, Albuquerque, NM
 2015 – Healing ... For the Time Being, A mixed media exhibition in conjunction with On the Map: Albuquerque Art and Design, Jonathan Abrams MD
 2015 – The AIPAD Photography Show, Represented by Joseph Bellows Gallery, New York, New York
 2016 – Transformational Imagemaking, traveling exhibition March-16- April 16; Muhlenberg College, Allentown, Pa.
 2016 – Fall-Rochester Institute of Technology, Bevier Gallery, Rochester, NY
 2016 – 60 from the 60's: Selections from the George Eastman Museum, At the Hyde Collection, Glens Falls, New York
 2016 – Transcendent Photography Betty Hahn and Patrick Nagatani Albuquerque/Bernalillo County Government Center, One Civic Plaza, Albuquerque, New Mexico
 2016 – Look Inside: New Photographic Acquisitions, University of Texas Ransom Center, Austin, Texas
 2016 – Light Works: A Century of Great Photography, Muscarelle Museum of Art, The College of William and Mary, Williamsport, VA
 2016 – After Modernism, Beyond the Medium, Museum of New Mexico Museum of Fine Arts, Santa Fe, New Mexico
 2016 – A History of Photography, The George Eastman Museum, History of Photography Gallery, Rochester, New York

Awards 
 National Endowment for the Arts Photographers Fellowship, $25,000
 National Endowment for the Arts Photographers Fellowship, $10,000
 New York State Council for the Arts $5,000
 Garner, Gretchen. Disappearing witness: change in twentieth-century American photography. JHU Press, 2003.
 Harrison, Joan. "Colour in the gum-bichromate process: A uniquely personal aesthetic." History of Photography 17.4 (1993): 369–376.

References 

American women photographers
1940 births
Living people
University of New Mexico faculty
Artists from Chicago
20th-century American artists
Indiana University alumni
20th-century American women artists
American women academics
21st-century American women
American embroiderers